Brush Grove is an unincorporated community in Washington County, Kentucky, United States.

References

Unincorporated communities in Washington County, Kentucky
Unincorporated communities in Kentucky